The 2004 Legg Mason Tenis Classic was the 36th edition of this tennis tournament and was played on outdoor hard courts.  The tournament was part of the International Series of the 2004 ATP Tour. It was held at the William H.G. FitzGerald Tennis Center in Washington, D.C. from August 16 through August 22, 2004.

Finals

Singles

 Lleyton Hewitt defeated  Gilles Müller, 6–3, 6–4
 It was Hewitt's 3rd title of the year and the 22nd of his career.

Doubles

 Chris Haggard /  Robbie Koenig defeated  Travis Parrott /  Dmitry Tursunov 7–6(7–3), 6–1

References

External links
 Official website
 ATP tournament profile

Legg Mason
Washington Open (tennis)
Legg Mason Tennis Classic
2004 in Washington, D.C.